Joachim Gérard and Stefan Olsson defeated the three-time defending champions Alfie Hewett and Gordon Reid in the final, 6−4, 6−2 to win the gentlemen's doubles wheelchair tennis title at the 2019 Wimbledon Championships. It was their first Wimbledon title as a pair, and Olsson's second Wimbledon doubles title overall.

Seeds

Draw

Finals

References
WC Men's Doubles

Men's Wheelchair Doubles
Wimbledon Championship by year – Wheelchair men's doubles